Fali Candé (born 24 January 1998) is Bissau-Guinean professional footballer who plays as a left-back for  club Metz and the Guinea-Bissau national team.

Club career
Candé made his professional debut with Portimonense in a 2-2 Primeira Liga tie with Benfica on 10 June 2020.

On 26 January 2022, Candé signed a contract with Metz in France until June 2026.

International career
He made his debut for Guinea-Bissau national football team on 26 March 2021 in an AFCON 2021 qualifier against Eswatini.

References

External links

ZeroZero Profile

1998 births
Living people
Sportspeople from Bissau
Bissau-Guinean footballers
Guinea-Bissau international footballers
Association football fullbacks
Portimonense S.C. players
Casa Pia A.C. players
FC Metz players
Primeira Liga players
Campeonato de Portugal (league) players
Ligue 1 players
Bissau-Guinean expatriate footballers
Bissau-Guinean expatriate sportspeople in Portugal
Expatriate footballers in Portugal
Bissau-Guinean expatriate sportspeople in France
Expatriate footballers in France
2021 Africa Cup of Nations players